Russ Diamond has been the Representative of the 102nd district since 2015. 
The 102nd Pennsylvania House of Representatives District is located in Lebanon County and includes the following areas:

 Annville Township
 Bethel Township
 Cleona
 Heidelberg Township
 Jackson Township
 Jonestown
 Millcreek Township
 Myerstown
 North Lebanon Township
 Richland
 South Lebanon Township
 Swatara Township
 Union Township
 West Lebanon Township

Representatives

Recent election results

References

Government of Lebanon County, Pennsylvania
102